Nassif Majdalani (10 October 1913 – 8 January 1988) was a Lebanese radio and television presenter, as well as president of the Lebanon Football Association (LFA), which he helped found in 1933, between 1946 and 1949. He is the youngest president in the LFA's history, aged 33 when he assumed office.

Majdalani graduated from the International School of Choueifat and was awarded the Lebanese Medal of Merit in 1935, as well as the rank of Knight in the National Order of the Cedar in 1955 and the rank of Officer in 1970.

References

Bibliography 
 

1913 births
1988 deaths
Founders of association football institutions
Lebanese radio presenters
Lebanese television presenters
Sportspeople from Beirut
Presidents of the Lebanese Football Association